Nižní Lhoty is a municipality and village in Frýdek-Místek District in the Moravian-Silesian Region of the Czech Republic. It has about 300 inhabitants.

Etymology
The name Lhoty is plural of Lhota, which a very common name of Slavic settlement, derived from lhůta (i.e. "period"). The adjective Nižní, originally Dolny neb Spodny (i.e. "lower") was used to differentiate it from the younger nearby sister settlement called originally Hornÿ, today Vyšní Lhoty ("Upper Lhoty").

Geography
It lies in the historical region of Cieszyn Silesia, in the western part of the Moravian-Silesian Foothills. The municipality lies on the right bank of the Morávka River.

History
Some sources state that the village was first mentioned in a Latin document of Diocese of Wrocław called Liber fundationis episcopatus Vratislaviensis from around 1305 as item Rudgeri villa, however it is very unlikely and disputed. Far more likely it was later mentioned in 1434 as Lhoty and in 1450 as Rozkowa Lhota. Later up the Morávka river the sister settlement of Vyšní Lhoty was established. They were then both mentioned in 1584. The name Nižní Lhoty was first used in 1573.

Politically the village belonged initially to the Duchy of Teschen. In 1573 it was sold as one of 16 villages and the town of Friedeck and formed a state country split from the Duchy of Teschen.

The village had a typical agricultural and pastoral character. In the 18th century, the road leading through the valley to the mountain area led outside the built-up part of the village, which led to the isolation of the village and only a very slow development of business and trade.

After World War I and fall of Austria-Hungary it became a part of Czechoslovakia. In March 1939 it became a part of Protectorate of Bohemia and Moravia. After World War II it was restored to Czechoslovakia.

Notes

References

External links

Villages in Frýdek-Místek District
Cieszyn Silesia